Eduardo Hans "Doddo" Andersen (born 16 October 1963) is a Norwegian singer-songwriter known as frontman of the band Unge Frustrerte Menn (UFM), a band that through seven albums gained local popularity in Bergen as well as nationwide performance at NRK.

Biography 
Doddo has in addition to the band UFM collaborated with Odd Nordstoga writing the revue "Kjærlighet er best på pinne" (Love is best on the stick lollipop), also the title of a book written by Doddo, about the four stages men go through in the pursuit of love.

Doddo is a permanent writer in the website of newspaper Bergens Tidendes where he blogs about all that concerns the football club Brann. Doddo has released five books. "Mitt Haukeland – En nær livet-opplevelse" (My Haukeland – A close to life experience) was released in 2012. The book is about Haukeland University Hospital, and was published in connection to the hospital's centenary anniversary.

Doddo is the son of the pianist Knut Albrigt Andersen, and the brother of musicians, guitarist Knut Luedy "Tino" Andersen and singer-songwriter and record producer Geir Luedy Andersen.

On 3 November 2022, Andersen was appointed Bergen City Commissioner for Culture, Volunteers and Inclusion in Rune Bakervik's new commission.

Discography 
 Slanger og Snegler – 1991 (Sigma Music)
 Doddo og Unge Frustrerte Menn – 1995 (Tylden & Co.)
 Sosialantropologi  – 1996 (Lucky Music)
 Hodet i Sanden – 1997 (Grappa)
 Øl og Peanøtter  – 1998 (Grappa)
 Dronningen av Kalde Føtter – 2001 (Grappa)
 Solen Titter Frem – 2002 (Grappa)

Bibliography 
 Kjærlighet er best på pinne (2005)
 Kjeks og samliv (2007)
 Hei, døden (2009)
 Fortellingen om Brann (2010)
 Mitt Haukeland. En nær livet-opplevelse (2012)

References

Eksterne lenker 
 Doddo's website
 Doddo's Brann-blogg
 MIC Article: Unge Frustrerte Menn
 Dagbladet.no: Kreftanstrengelsen
 Presentation of Eduardo Andersen in Forfatterkatalogen at Forfattersentrum's website

1963 births
Norwegian singer-songwriters
20th-century Norwegian male singers
20th-century Norwegian singers
Musicians from Bergen
Living people
21st-century Norwegian male singers
21st-century Norwegian singers